Ettore Fieramosca was an Italian submarine which served with the Regia Marina in World War II. She was named after Ettore Fieramosca, an Italian condottiero of the 16th century.

Design
Ettore Fieramosca was designed by the firm Bernardis and was intended to be a cruiser submarine which carried a seaplane in a waterproof hangar and a  gun; such a design was inspired by the similar (although bigger) , then under construction in France. Several prototype seaplanes were designed but not deployed and the hangar was removed in 1931. The deck gun was initially a  27-calibre OTO model of 1924, but this was later replaced by a 120 mm 45-calibre OTO model of 1931.

However Ettore Fieramosca proved to be rather over-dimensioned for her armament, slower than intended—the intended speed of  while surfaced was never achieved—with poor maneuverability, both surfaced and underwater, and rather poor endurance. Due to her huge cost and these shortcomings, plans to build more boats to the same designs were shelved.

Career
Ettore Fieramosca was built by Cantieri navali Tosi di Taranto. She was laid down in 1926, launched on 15 April 1929 and completed in 1930. During a second patrol in February, the boat bombarded Barcelona with a total of 45 shells on the nights of 8/9 and 9/10 February, slightly damaging the  tanker  on the second night.

Plagued with incidents and mechanical trouble for her entire career, she was deployed on only a few operational patrols in 1940, but did not achieve any successes against enemy targets.

She suffered a battery explosion late in 1940 and was decommissioned in April 1941; eventually she was stricken and scrapped.

See also
 Italian submarines of World War II

Notes

References
Bagnasco, Erminio. Brescia, Maurizio (January 2014). I sommergibili italiani 1940-1943. Parte 2a - Oceani. Parma, Storia Militare Dossier n. 12.

Chesneau, Roger, ed. (1980). Conway's All the World's Fighting Ships 1922–1946. Greenwich, UK: Conway Maritime Press. .

External links
 Sommergibili Marina Militare website

Submarines of the Regia Marina
Ships built by Cantieri navali Tosi di Taranto
Ships built in Taranto
1929 ships
World War II submarines of Italy
Non-combat internal explosions on warships